Don Balfour (11 November 1918 – 21 April 2008) was an Australian rules footballer who played with Collingwood and Richmond in the Victorian Football League (VFL).

Balfour made grand final appearances in each of his first two seasons and finished on the losing team in both. A defender, he was in back pocket for the 1938 VFL Grand Final and on a half back flank in the 1939 Grand Final. His participation was limited during the war, he played just two games in 1941 and didn't play any senior football in 1942.

He spent the second half of the 1945 season at Richmond and remained with the club in 1946. The following year he was captain-coach of Launceston club City in the Northern Tasmanian Football Association and guided them to the grand final, but again suffered defeat.

References

1918 births
Collingwood Football Club players
Richmond Football Club players
City-South Football Club players
City-South Football Club coaches
Australian rules footballers from Victoria (Australia)
2008 deaths